Willie Gay Jr. (born February 15, 1998) is an American football linebacker for the Kansas City Chiefs of the National Football League (NFL). He played college football at Mississippi State. He was drafted by the Chiefs with the 63rd overall selection in the 2020 NFL Draft.

Early years
Gay attended Starkville High School in Starkville, Mississippi. At Starkville High School, he won the 2015 6A State Championship. He played in the 2017 U.S. Army All-American Bowl. He committed to Mississippi State University to play college football.

College career
Gay played at Mississippi State from 2017 to 2019. As a junior in 2019, he played in only five games and missed eight due to suspension. After the season, he entered the 2020 NFL Draft, forgoing his senior season. During his career, he had 99 tackles, six sacks, three interceptions and a touchdown.

Professional career

2020 season
Gay was selected by the Kansas City Chiefs in the second round with the 63rd overall pick in the 2020 NFL Draft.

In Week 5 against the Las Vegas Raiders, Gay recorded his first career sack.

On February 6, 2021, Gay was placed on injured reserve, forcing him to miss Super Bowl LV.

2021 season
Gay was placed on injured reserve on September 2, 2021. He was activated on October 9.

2022 season
On September 19, 2022, Gay was suspended for four games for violating the NFL's personal conduct policy due to his arrest in January 2022. Gay went on to help the Chiefs win Super Bowl LVII against the Philadelphia Eagles 38-35. Gay recorded 8 tackles in the Super Bowl.

Legal trouble
Gay was arrested on January 19, 2022, for misdemeanor criminal destruction of property less than $1,000. He reportedly went to see his son at his son's mother's house. The two got into an argument and Gay damaged a vacuum cleaner, a humidifier, and a cellphone screen protector, as well as a wall and door.

References

External links
Kansas City Chiefs bio
Mississippi State Bulldogs bio

1998 births
Living people
Sportspeople from Starkville, Mississippi
Players of American football from Mississippi
American football linebackers
Mississippi State Bulldogs football players
Kansas City Chiefs players